Samatiguila Department is a department of Kabadougou Region in Denguélé District, Ivory Coast. In 2021, its population was 19,710, making it the least-populous department in the country. The departmental seat is the settlement of Samatiguila. The sub-prefectures of the department are Kimbirila-Sud and Samatiguila.

History
Samatiguila Department was created in 2009 as a second-level subdivision via a split-off from Odienné Department. At its creation, it was part of Denguélé Region.

In 2011, districts were introduced as new first-level subdivisions of Ivory Coast. At the same time, regions were reorganised and became second-level subdivisions and all departments were converted into third-level subdivisions. At this time, Samatiguila Department became part of Kabadougou Region in Denguélé District.

Notes

States and territories established in 2009
2009 establishments in Ivory Coast
Departments of Kabadougou